The President's Tatrakshak Medal is an Indian military decoration, awarded for selfless devotion, distinguished and meritorious service in Indian Coast Guard. It is conferred by the President of India every year on the occasion of national celebrations, Independence Day and Republic Day. It is being presented to the Indian Armed Forces since January 26, 1990, a few years later the Constitution of India came into existence.

History
The President's Tatrakshak Medal (PTM) is given by the president of India while Tatrakshak Medal (TM) is generally given by the defense minister of India. These are two highest awards conferred to coast guard. It was originally established on 7 June 1989 to honour and encourage selfless devotion of the coast guard personnels. However, the first award was conferred on 26 January 1990 and the last award was given on the Republic day 2020.

References 

Indian awards
Military awards and decorations of India